Khuthbapalli (Tamil:குத்பாபள்ளி), (French:Couttoubapalli, Cottoubapalli) is an 18th-century mosque of Pondicherry. Khutbah literally means the Friday sermon given in a mosque. Khuthbapalli means that it is a mosque where Friday Prayers are also held in addition to the regular prayers.

History
Khuthbapalli is believed to be the first mosque built in Pondicherry, though not at its present location but in the White Town of Pondicherry. According to the Dutch map of Pondicherry Fort in 1693, two mosques are located in the White Town of Pondicherry. One is believed to be Khuthbapalli and the other to be Meerapalli. Meerapalli was relocated during the first half of the 18th Century to the present location where as Khuthbapalli, an ancient mosque then itself remained in the Western part of White Town till the destruction of the White Town of Pondicherry by the English in 1761. This was the ancient mosque that the French soldiers of Dupleix came to destroy in 1948 but were stopped in the process due to the Muslims of Pondicherry and especially by the timely intervention of Abdul Rahman. The French renamed the rue de la monnaie to rue Victor Simonel which stands same to this day. Actually rue de la monnaie was known as rue de la mosquee in Pondicherry during the Governorship of Joseph François Dupleix. Rue de la mosquee means Mosque Street in English meaning that the street housed the ancient mosque of Khuthbapalli.

Markaz
Khuthbapalli functions as the Markaz or the Headquarters of Tablighi Jamaat's Pondicherry Chapter.

References

Mosques in Puducherry
17th-century mosques